Blackstairs Mountain in southern Leinster, is the second-highest mountain in the Blackstairs Mountains.The mountain stretches from Rathgeran to Gowlin at Cathaoirs Den

See also
List of mountains in Ireland

Mountains and hills of County Carlow
Mountains and hills of County Wexford
Mountains under 1000 metres